The Washington Commanders Marching Band is the marching band for the Washington Commanders of the National Football League (NFL). Founded in 1937, they are the oldest marching band of the National Football League. They perform the fight song "Hail to the Commanders" after the team scores touchdowns at home games. The band went inactive in 2020 when the team stopped using the name "Redskins", but returned in 2022 after the team rebranded as the Commanders.

References

External links
 

Washington Commanders
Musical groups established in 1937
1937 establishments in Washington, D.C.
NFL marching bands